Orathanadu block, which is pronounced as 'Oraththanaadu' block, is a revenue block in the Orathanadu taluk of Thanjavur district, Tamil Nadu, India. There are a total of 58 villages in this block.

List of Panchayat Villages

References 

 

Revenue blocks of Thanjavur district